Tamaulipas massacre may refer to
2010 Tamaulipas massacre, the mass murder of 72 illegal immigrants, on August 24, 2010
2011 Tamaulipas massacre, the mass murder of at least 177 people discovered in mass graves on April 6, 2011